Dathe is a German-origin surname. People with the surname include:

 Heinrich Dathe (1910–1991), German zoologist 
 Heinz Dathe, East German rower
 Toni Dathe-Fabri, German screenwriter and actress

Surnames of German origin